Aegiale or Aigiale and Aegialen, also known as Begialis (Βεγιαλίς), was an ancient town on the island of Amorgos. 

The site of Aegiale is located near modern Tholaria.

References

Populated places in the ancient Aegean islands
Former populated places in Greece
Amorgos
Ancient Greek archaeological sites in Greece